Christina Baum (née Sauser; born 21 March 1956) is a German politician from the AfD. She has been a Member of the German Bundestag from Baden-Württemberg since 2021.

References

See also 

 List of members of the 20th Bundestag

Living people
1956 births
Members of the Bundestag for Baden-Württemberg
21st-century German politicians
21st-century German women politicians
Members of the Bundestag 2021–2025
Female members of the Bundestag

Members of the Bundestag for the Alternative for Germany
Members of the Landtag of Baden-Württemberg